PMF may stand for:

 Danish Union of Educators (Danish: Pædagogisk Medhjælper Forbund), a former Danish trade union
 Pacific Music Festival, an international classical music festival held annually in Sapporo, Japan
 Paramilitary forces, a semi-militarized force
 Private military firm, a private company providing armed combat or security services for financial gain.
 Parma Airport, Italy (IATA airport code)
 Peptide mass fingerprinting, an analytical technique for protein identification
 Pierre Mendès France (1907–1982), Prime Minister of France
 Polarization-maintaining optical fiber, a type of optical fiber
 Polycarbon monofluoride, a graphite compound with fluorine; also known as carbon monofluoride
 Popular Mobilization Forces, an Iraqi state-sponsored umbrella organization
 Potential of mean force, in chemistry, potential giving the average force on a particle from a set of molecules
 Presidential Management Fellows Program, a US government fellowship
 Primary myelofibrosis, a disease affecting the bone marrow.
 Probability mass function, in statistics, function giving the probability that a variable takes a particular value
 Product/market fit, in marketing, the degree to which a product satisfies a strong market demand
 Professional Medical Film, a U.S. Army designation
 Progressive massive fibrosis, an interstitial lung disease complication often seen in silicosis and pneumoconiosis
 Protected Management Frames, a security feature of WiFi connections, see IEEE 802.11w-2009
 Proton motive force, a measure of energy in biological reactions
 PMF, hacker turned as federal informant (operation Cybersnare)
 .pmf, a Sony PlayStation Portable movie file, a proprietary format that can be extracted from PSP disk images